The 23rd United States Congress was a meeting of the legislative branch of the United States federal government, consisting of the United States Senate and the United States House of Representatives. It met in Washington, D.C. from March 4, 1833, to March 4, 1835, during the fifth and sixth years of Andrew Jackson's presidency. The apportionment of seats in the House of Representatives was based on the 1830 United States census. The Senate had an Anti-Jacksonian or National Republican majority, and the House had a Jacksonian or Democratic majority.

Major events 

 March 28, 1834: Senate censured President Andrew Jackson for defunding the Second Bank of the United States
 June 2, 1834: A special election for the House speakership takes 10 ballots.
 January 30, 1835: Richard Lawrence unsuccessfully tried to assassinate President Jackson in the United States Capitol; this was the first assassination attempt against a President of the United States.

Major legislation

Party summary
The count below identifies party affiliations at the beginning of the first session of this congress. Changes resulting from subsequent replacements are shown below in the "Changes in membership" section.

Senate

House of Representatives
For the beginning of this congress, the size of the House was increased from 213 seats to 240 seats, following the 1830 United States Census.

Leadership

Senate 

 President: Martin Van Buren (J)
 President pro tempore: Hugh Lawson White (J), until December 15, 1833
 George Poindexter (NR), June 28, 1834 – November 30, 1834
 John Tyler (NR), from March 3, 1835

House of Representatives 
 Speaker: Andrew Stevenson (J), until June 2, 1834
 John Bell (J), after June 2, 1834, elected on the 10th ballot

Members 
This list is arranged by chamber, then by state. Senators are listed by class, and representatives are listed by district.

Skip to House of Representatives, below

Senate 
Senators were elected by the state legislatures every two years, with one-third beginning new six-year terms with each Congress. Preceding the names in the list below are Senate class numbers, which indicate the cycle of their election. In this Congress, Class 1 meant their term began with this Congress, requiring reelection in 1838; Class 2 meant their term ended with this Congress, requiring reelection in 1834; and Class 3 meant their term began in the last Congress, requiring reelection in 1836.

Alabama 
 2. William R. King (J)
 3. Gabriel Moore (NR)

Connecticut 
 1. Nathan Smith (NR)
 3. Gideon Tomlinson (NR)

Delaware 
 1. Arnold Naudain (NR)
 2. John M. Clayton (NR)

Georgia 
 2. George Troup (J), until November 8, 1833
 John P. King (J), from November 21, 1833
 3. John Forsyth (J), until July 27, 1834
 Alfred Cuthbert (J), from January 12, 1835

Illinois 
 2. John M. Robinson (J)
 3. Elias Kane (J)

Indiana 
 1. John Tipton (J)
 3. William Hendricks (NR)

Kentucky 
 2. George M. Bibb (J)
 3. Henry Clay (NR)

Louisiana 
 2. George A. Waggaman (NR)
 3. Josiah S. Johnston (NR), until May 19, 1833
 Alexander Porter (NR), from December 19, 1833

Maine 
 1. Ether Shepley (J)
 2. Peleg Sprague (NR), until January 1, 1835
 John Ruggles (J), from January 20, 1835

Maryland 
 1. Joseph Kent (NR)
 3. Ezekiel F. Chambers (NR), until December 20, 1834
 Robert H. Goldsborough (NR), from January 13, 1835

Massachusetts 
 1. Daniel Webster (NR)
 2. Nathaniel Silsbee (NR)

Mississippi 
 1. John Black (NR), from November 22, 1833
 2. George Poindexter (NR)

Missouri 
 1. Thomas H. Benton (J)
 3. Alexander Buckner (J), until June 5, 1833
 Lewis F. Linn (J), from October 25, 1833

New Hampshire 
 2. Samuel Bell (NR)
 3. Isaac Hill (J)

New Jersey 
 1. Samuel L. Southard (NR)
 2. Theodore Frelinghuysen (NR)

New York 
 1. Nathaniel P. Tallmadge (J)
 3. Silas Wright (J)

North Carolina 
 2. Bedford Brown (J)
 3. Willie P. Mangum (NR)

Ohio 
 1. Thomas Morris (J)
 3. Thomas Ewing (NR)

Pennsylvania 
 1. Samuel McKean (J), from December 7, 1833
 3. William Wilkins (J), until June 30, 1834
 James Buchanan (J), from December 6, 1834

Rhode Island 
 1. Asher Robbins (NR)
 2. Nehemiah R. Knight (NR)

South Carolina 
 2. John C. Calhoun (N)
 3. William C. Preston (N), from November 26, 1833

Tennessee 
 1. Felix Grundy (J)
 2. Hugh Lawson White (J)

Vermont 
 1. Benjamin Swift (NR)
 3. Samuel Prentiss (NR)

Virginia 
 1. John Tyler (NR)
 2. William Rives (J), until February 22, 1834
 Benjamin W. Leigh (NR), from February 26, 1834

House of Representatives

Alabama 
 . Clement C. Clay (J)
 . John McKinley (J)
 . Samuel W. Mardis (J)
 . Dixon H. Lewis (N)
 . John Murphy (J)

Connecticut 
All representatives were elected statewide on a general ticket.
 . Noyes Barber (NR)
 . William W. Ellsworth (NR), until July 8, 1834
 Joseph Trumbull (NR), from December 1, 1834
 . Jabez W. Huntington (NR), until August 16, 1834
 Phineas Miner (NR), from December 1, 1834
 . Samuel A. Foote (NR), until May 9, 1834
 Ebenezer Jackson Jr. (NR), from December 1, 1834
 . Samuel Tweedy (NR)
 . Ebenezer Young (NR)

Delaware 
 . John J. Milligan (NR)

Georgia 
All representatives were elected statewide on a general ticket.
 . Augustin S. Clayton (J)
 . John E. Coffee (J)
 . Thomas F. Foster (J)
 . Roger L. Gamble (J)
 . George R. Gilmer (J)
 . Seaborn Jones (J)
 . William Schley (J)
 . James M. Wayne (J), until January 13, 1835, vacant thereafter
 . Richard Henry Wilde (J)

Illinois 
 . Charles Slade (J), until July 26, 1834
 John Reynolds (J), from December 1, 1834
 . Zadok Casey (J)
 . Joseph Duncan (J), until September 21, 1834
 William L. May (J), from December 1, 1834

Indiana 
 . Ratliff Boon (J)
 . John Ewing (NR)
 . John Carr (J)
 . Amos Lane (J)
 . Johnathan McCarty (J)
 . George L. Kinnard (J)
 . Edward A. Hannegan (J)

Kentucky 
 . Chittenden Lyon (J)
 . Albert G. Hawes (J)
 . Christopher Tompkins (NR)
 . Martin Beaty (NR)
 . Robert P. Letcher (NR), from August 6, 1834
 . Thomas Chilton (NR)
 . Benjamin Hardin (NR)
 . Patrick H. Pope (J)
 . James Love (NR)
 . Chilton Allan (NR)
 . Amos Davis (NR)
 . Thomas A. Marshall (NR)
 . Richard M. Johnson (J)

Louisiana 
 . Edward D. White (NR), until November 15, 1834
 Henry Johnson (NR), from December 1, 1834
 . Philemon Thomas (J)
 . Henry A. Bullard (NR), until January 4, 1834
 Rice Garland (NR), from April 28, 1834

Maine 
 . Rufus McIntire (J)
 . Francis O. J. Smith (J)
 . Edward Kavanagh (J)
 . George Evans (NR)
 . Moses Mason Jr. (J)
 . Leonard Jarvis (J)
 . Joseph Hall (J)
 . Gorham Parks (J)

Maryland 
 . Littleton P. Dennis (NR), until April 14, 1834
 John N. Steele (NR), from June 9, 1834
 . Richard B. Carmichael (J)
 . James Turner (J)
 . James P. Heath (J)
 . Isaac McKim (J)
 . William Cost Johnson (NR)
 . Francis Thomas (J)
 . John T. Stoddert (J)

Massachusetts 
 . Benjamin Gorham (NR)
 . Rufus Choate (NR), until June 30, 1834
 Stephen C. Phillips (NR), from December 1, 1834
 . Gayton P. Osgood (J)
 . Edward Everett (NR)
 . John Davis (NR), until January 14, 1834
 Levi Lincoln Jr. (NR), from March 5, 1834
 . George Grennell Jr. (NR)
 . George N. Briggs (NR)
 . Isaac C. Bates (NR)
 . William Jackson (AM)
 . William Baylies (NR)
 . John Reed Jr. (NR)
 . John Quincy Adams (AM)

Mississippi 
All representatives were elected statewide on a general ticket.
 . Harry Cage (J)
 . Franklin E. Plummer (J)

Missouri 
All representatives were elected statewide on a general ticket.
 . William H. Ashley (J)
 . John Bull (NR)

New Hampshire 
All representatives were elected statewide on a general ticket.
 . Benning M. Bean (J)
 . Robert Burns (J)
 . Joseph M. Harper (J)
 . Henry Hubbard (J)
 . Franklin Pierce (J)

New Jersey 
All representatives were elected statewide on a general ticket.
 . Philemon Dickerson (J)
 . Samuel Fowler (J)
 . Thomas Lee (J)
 . James Parker (J)
 . Ferdinand S. Schenck (J)
 . William N. Shinn (J)

New York 
There were five plural districts, the 8th, 17th, 22nd & 23rd had two representatives each, the 3rd had four representatives.
 . Abel Huntington (J)
 . Isaac B. Van Houten (J)
 . Churchill C. Cambreleng (J)
 . Cornelius V. Lawrence (J), until May 14, 1834
 John J. Morgan (J), from December 1, 1834
 . Dudley Selden (J), until July 1, 1834
 Charles G. Ferris (J), from December 1, 1834
 . Campbell P. White (J)
 . Aaron Ward (J)
 . Abraham Bockee (J)
 . John W. Brown (J)
 . Charles Bodle (J)
 . John Adams (J)
 . Aaron Vanderpoel (J)
 . Job Pierson (J)
 . Gerrit Y. Lansing (J)
 . John Cramer (J)
 . Henry C. Martindale (AM)
 . Reuben Whallon (J)
 . Ransom H. Gillet (J)
 . Charles McVean (J)
 . Abijah Mann Jr. (J)
 . Samuel Beardsley (J)
 . Joel Turrill (J)
 . Daniel Wardwell (J)
 . Sherman Page (J)
 . Noadiah Johnson (J)
 . Henry Mitchell (J)
 . Nicoll Halsey (J)
 . Samuel G. Hathaway (J)
 . William K. Fuller (J)
 . William Taylor (J)
 . Rowland Day (J)
 . Samuel Clark (J)
 . John Dickson (AM)
 . Edward Howell (J)
 . Frederick Whittlesey (AM)
 . George W. Lay (AM)
 . Philo C. Fuller (AM)
 . Abner Hazeltine (AM)
 . Millard Fillmore (AM)
 . Gideon Hard (AM)

North Carolina 
 . William B. Shepard (NR)
 . Jesse A. Bynum (J)
 . Thomas H. Hall (J)
 . Jesse Speight (J)
 . James I. McKay (J)
 . Micajah T. Hawkins (J)
 . Edmund Deberry (NR)
 . Daniel L. Barringer (NR)
 . Augustine H. Shepperd (NR)
 . Abraham Rencher (NR)
 . Henry W. Connor (J)
 . James Graham (NR)
 . Lewis Williams (NR)

Ohio 
 . Robert T. Lytle (J), until March 10, 1834, and from December 27, 1834
 . Taylor Webster (J)
 . Joseph H. Crane (NR)
 . Thomas Corwin (NR)
 . Thomas L. Hamer (J)
 . Samuel F. Vinton (NR)
 . William Allen (J)
 . Jeremiah McLene (J)
 . John Chaney (J)
 . Joseph Vance (NR)
 . James M. Bell (NR)
 . Robert Mitchell (J)
 . David Spangler (NR)
 . William Patterson (J)
 . Jonathan Sloane (AM)
 . Elisha Whittlesey (AM)
 . John Thomson (J)
 . Benjamin Jones (J)
 . Humphrey H. Leavitt (J), until July 10, 1834
 Daniel Kilgore (J), from December 1, 1834

Pennsylvania 
There were two plural districts, the 2nd had two representatives, the 4th had three representatives.
 . Joel B. Sutherland (J)
 . Horace Binney (NR)
 . James Harper (NR)
 . John G. Watmough (NR)
 . Edward Darlington (AM)
 . William Hiester (AM)
 . David Potts Jr. (AM)
 . Joel K. Mann (J)
 . Robert Ramsey (J)
 . David D. Wagener (J)
 . Henry King (J)
 . Henry A. P. Muhlenberg (J)
 . William Clark (AM)
 . Charles A. Barnitz (AM)
 . George Chambers (AM)
 . Jesse Miller (J)
 . Joseph Henderson (J)
 . Andrew Beaumont (J)
 . Joseph B. Anthony (J)
 . John Laporte (J)
 . George Burd (NR)
 . Richard Coulter (J)
 . Andrew Stewart (AM)
 . Thomas M. T. McKennan (AM)
 . Harmar Denny (AM)
 . Samuel S. Harrison (J)
 . John Banks (AM)
 . John Galbraith (J)

Rhode Island 
Both representatives were elected statewide on a general ticket.
 . Tristam Burges (NR)
 . Dutee J. Pearce (AM)

South Carolina 
 . Henry L. Pinckney (N)
 . William J. Grayson (N)
 . Thomas D. Singleton (N), until November 25, 1833
 Robert B. Campbell (N), from February 27, 1834
 . John Myers Felder (N)
 . George McDuffie (N), until ????, 1834
 Francis W. Pickens (N), from December 8, 1834
 . Warren R. Davis (N), until January 29, 1835, vacant thereafter
 . William K. Clowney (N)
 . James Blair (J), until April 1, 1834
 Richard I. Manning (J), from December 8, 1834
 . John K. Griffin (N)

Tennessee 
 . John Blair (J)
 . Samuel Bunch (J)
 . Luke Lea (J)
 . James I. Standifer (J)
 . John B. Forester (J)
 . Balie Peyton (J)
 . John Bell (J)
 . David W. Dickinson (J)
 . James K. Polk (J)
 . William M. Inge (J)
 . Cave Johnson (J)
 . David Crockett (NR)
 . William C. Dunlap (J)

Vermont 
 . Hiland Hall (NR)
 . William Slade (AM)
 . Horace Everett (NR)
 . Heman Allen (NR)
 . Benjamin F. Deming (AM), until July 11, 1834
 Henry F. Janes (AM), from December 2, 1834

Virginia 
 . George Loyall (J)
 . John Y. Mason (J)
 . William S. Archer (J)
 . James H. Gholson (NR)
 . John Randolph (J), until May 24, 1833
 Thomas T. Bouldin (J), from December 2, 1833, until February 11, 1834
 James W. Bouldin (J), from March 28, 1834
 . Thomas Davenport (NR)
 . Nathaniel H. Claiborne (J)
 . Henry A. Wise (J)
 . William P. Taylor (NR)
 . Joseph W. Chinn (J)
 . Andrew Stevenson (J), until June 2, 1834
 John Robertson (NR), from December 1, 1834
 . William F. Gordon (J)
 . John M. Patton (J)
 . Charles F. Mercer (NR)
 . Edward Lucas (J)
 . James M. H. Beale (J)
 . Samuel M. Moore (NR)
 . John H. Fulton (J)
 . William McComas (J)
 . John J. Allen (NR)
 . Edgar C. Wilson (NR)

Non-voting members 
 . Ambrose H. Sevier (J)
 . Joseph M. White (J)
 . Lucius Lyon (J)

Changes in membership 
The count below reflects changes from the beginning of the first session of this Congress.

Senate 

|-
| South Carolina(3)
| colspan=2 style="font-size:80%" | Vacant since March 3, 1833, due to the resignation of Stephen Decatur Miller (N).Successor was elected November 26, 1833.
|  | William C. Preston (N)
| November 26, 1833

|-
| Mississippi(1)
| colspan=2 style="font-size:80%" | Vacant from the start of this Congress due to the state legislature's failure to elect.Appointee who had held the seat at the end of the previous Congress was elected November 22, 1833.
|  | John Black (NR)
| November 22, 1833

|-
| Pennsylvania(1)
| colspan=2 style="font-size:80%" | Vacant from the start of this Congress due to the state legislature's failure to elect.Successor was elected December 7, 1833.
|  | Samuel McKean (J)
| December 7, 1833

|-
| Louisiana(3)
|  | Josiah S. Johnston (NR)
| style="font-size:80%" | Died May 19, 1833.Successor was elected December 19, 1833.
|  | Alexander Porter (NR)
| December 19, 1833

|-
| Missouri(3)
|  | Alexander Buckner (J)
| style="font-size:80%" | Died June 6, 1833.Successor was appointed December 19, 1833, and subsequently elected to finish the term.
|  | Lewis F. Linn (J)
| October 25, 1833

|-
| Georgia(2)
|  | George Troup (J)
| style="font-size:80%" | Resigned November 8, 1833.Successor was elected November 21, 1833.
|  | John P. King (D)
| November 21, 1833

|-
| Virginia(2)
|  | William Rives (J)
| style="font-size:80%" | Resigned February 22, 1834.Successor was elected February 26, 1834.
|  | Benjamin W. Leigh (NR)
| February 26, 1834

|-
| Pennsylvania(3)
|  | William Wilkins (J)
| style="font-size:80%" | Resigned June 30, 1834, to become U.S. Minister to Russia.Successor elected December 6, 1834.
|  | James Buchanan (J)
| December 6, 1834

|-
| Georgia(3)
|  | John Forsyth (J)
| style="font-size:80%" | Resigned July 27, 1834, to become U.S. Secretary of State.Successor elected January 12, 1835.
|  | Alfred Cuthbert (J)
| January 12, 1835

|-
| Maryland(3)
|  | Ezekiel F. Chambers (NR)
| style="font-size:80%" | Resigned December 20, 1834, to become judge of the Maryland Court of Appeals.Successor elected January 13, 1835.
|  | Robert H. Goldsborough (NR)
| January 13, 1835

|-
| Maine(2)
|  | Peleg Sprague (NR)
| style="font-size:80%" | Resigned January 1, 1835.Successor elected January 20, 1835.
|  | John Ruggles (J)
| January 20, 1835
|}

House of Representatives 
 Replacements: 18
 Jacksonian: 1 seat net loss
 National Republican: 1 seat net gain
 Deaths: 8
 Resignations: 15
 Contested election: 1
Total seats with changes: 23

|-
| 
| Vacant
| Contested election of Thomas P. Moore.  House denied either party the seat and declared new election 
|  | Robert P. Letcher (NR)
| Seated August 6, 1834

|-
| 
|  | Joel B. Sutherland (J)
| Resigned before the term to become a judge, but then left that judgeship to seek his old seat and re-elected October 8, 1833.
|  | Joel B. Sutherland (J)
| Seated December 2, 1833

|-
| 
|  | John Randolph (J)
| Died May 24, 1833
|  | Thomas T. Bouldin (J)
| Seated December 2, 1833
|-
| 
|  | Thomas D. Singleton (N)
| Died November 25, 1833
|  | Robert B. Campbell (N)
| Seated February 27, 1834
|-
| 
|  | George McDuffie (N)
| Resigned some time in 1834.
|  | Francis W. Pickens (N)
| Seated December 8, 1834
|-
| 
|  | Henry A. Bullard (NR)
| Resigned January 4, 1834, after being appointed as a judge of the Supreme Court of Louisiana
|  | Rice Garland (NR)
| Seated April 28, 1834
|-
| 
|  | John Davis (NR)
| Resigned January 14, 1834, after being elected Governor of Massachusetts
|  | Levi Lincoln (NR)
| Seated March 5, 1834
|-
| 
|  | Thomas T. Bouldin (J)
| Died February 11, 1834
|  | James W. Bouldin (J)
| Seated March 28, 1834
|-
| 
|  | Robert T. Lytle (J)
| Resigned March 10, 1834
|  | Robert T. Lytle (J)
| Re-seated December 27, 1834
|-
| 
|  | James Blair (J)
| Died April 1, 1834
|  | Richard I. Manning (J)
| Seated December 8, 1834
|-
| 
|  | Littleton P. Dennis (J)
| Died April 14, 1834
|  | John N. Steele (J)
| Seated June 9, 1834
|-
| 
|  | Samuel A. Foot (NR)
| Resigned May 9, 1834, after becoming Governor of Connecticut
|  | Ebenezer Jackson Jr. (NR)
| Seated December 1, 1834
|-
| 
|  | Cornelius V. Lawrence (J)
| Resigned May 14, 1834, after becoming Mayor of New York City. This was a plural district with 4 representatives.
|  | John J. Morgan (J)
| Seated December 1, 1834
|-
| 
|  | Andrew Stevenson (J)
| Resigned June 2, 1834
|  | John Robertson (NR)
| Seated December 1, 1834
|-
| 
|  | Rufus Choate (NR)
| Resigned June 30, 1834
|  | Stephen C. Phillips (NR)
| Seated December 1, 1834
|-
| 
|  | Dudley Selden (J)
| Resigned July 1, 1834. This was a plural district with 4 representatives.
|  | Charles G. Ferris (J)
| Seated December 1, 1834
|-
| 
|  | William W. Ellsworth (NR)
| Resigned July 8, 1834
|  | Joseph Trumbull (NR)
| Seated December 1, 1834
|-
| 
|  | Humphrey H. Leavitt (J)
| Resigned July 10, 1834, after becoming judge of the US District Court of Ohio
|  | Daniel Kilgore (J)
| Seated December 1, 1834
|-
| 
|  | Benjamin F. Deming (AM)
| Died July 11, 1834
|  | Henry F. Janes (AM)
| Seated December 2, 1834
|-
| 
|  | Charles Slade (J)
| Died July 26, 1834
|  | John Reynolds (J)
| Seated December 1, 1834
|-
| 
|  | Jabez W. Huntington (NR)
| Resigned August 16, 1834, after being appointed judge of the Connecticut Supreme Court of Errors
|  | Phineas Miner (NR)
| Seated December 1, 1834
|-
| 
|  | Joseph Duncan (J)
| Resigned September 21, 1834, after being elected Governor of Illinois
|  | William L. May (J)
| Seated December 1, 1834
|-
| 
|  | Edward D. White (NR)
| Resigned November 15, 1834, to become Governor of Louisiana
|  | Henry Johnson (NR)
| Seated December 1, 1834
|-
| 
|  | James M. Wayne (J)
| Resigned January 13, 1835, after being appointed an Associate Justice of the United States Supreme Court
| colspan=2 rowspan=2 | Not filled in this Congress
|-
| 
|  | Warren R. Davis (N)
| Died January 29, 1835
|}

Committees
Lists of committees and their party leaders.

Senate

 Agriculture (Chairman: Bedford Brown)
 Amendments to the Constitution (Select)
 Audit and Control the Contingent Expenses of the Senate (Chairman: Nehemiah Knight)
 Claims (Chairman: Samuel Bell)
 Commerce (Chairman: Nathaniel Silsbee)
 Distributing Public Revenue Among the States (Select)
 District of Columbia (Chairman: Ezekiel F. Chambers then John Tyler)
 Engrossed Bills (Chairman: Ether Shepley)
 Establishing Branches of the Mint (Select)
 Executive Patronage (Select)
 Finance (Chairman: Daniel Webster)
 Foreign Relations (Chairman: William Wilkins then Henry Clay)
 French Spoilations (Select)
 Indian Affairs (Chairman: Hugh Lawson White)
 Judiciary (Chairman: John M. Clayton) 
 Manufactures (Chairman: Theodore Frelinghuysen)
 Michigan and Arkansas Admission to the Union (Select)
 Mileage of Members of Congress (Select)
 Military Affairs (Chairman: Nathaniel Silsbee)
 Militia (Chairman: John M. Robinson)
 Naval Affairs (Chairman: Samuel Southard)
 Pensions (Chairman: Gideon Tomlinson)
 Post Office and Post Roads (Chairman: Felix Grundy)
 President's Message Refusing to Furnish a Paper to Senate (Select)
 Private Land Claims (Chairman: William Hendricks)
 Public Lands (Chairman: George Poindexter)
 Purchasing Boyd Reilly's Gas Apparatus (Select)
 Revolutionary Claims (Chairman: Gabriel Moore)
 Roads and Canals (Chairman: William Hendricks)
 Shiloh National Park (Select)
 Tariff Regulation (Select)
 Whole

House of Representatives

 Accounts (Chairman: Joel K. Mann)
 Agriculture (Chairman: Abraham Bockee)
 Bank of the United States (Select)
 Biennial Register (Select)
 Boundary of the Chickasaw Indians (Select)
 Claims (Chairman: Elisha Whittlesey)
 Commerce (Chairman: Joel B. Sutherland)
 District of Columbia (Chairman: Joseph Chinn)
 Elections (Chairman: Nathaniel Claiborne)
 Establishing an Assay Office in the Gold Region (Select)
 Expenditures in the Navy Department (Chairman: Joseph Hall)
 Expenditures in the Post Office Department (Chairman: Albert G. Hawes)
 Expenditures in the State Department (Chairman: Augustine Henry Shepperd)
 Expenditures in the Treasury Department (Chairman: Heman Allen)
 Expenditures in the War Department (Chairman: Frederick Whittlesey)
 Expenditures on Public Buildings (Chairman: Reuben Whallon)
 Foreign Affairs (Chairman: William S. Archer then John Young Mason)
 Foreign Relations (Chairman: William S. Archer then John Young Mason)
 Indian Affairs (Chairman: Dixon H. Lewis)
 Invalid Pensions (Chairman: Tristam Burges)
 Judiciary (Chairman: John Bell then Thomas F. Foster)
 Manufactures (Chairman: John Quincy Adams)
 Military Affairs (Chairman: Richard M. Johnson)
 Naval Affairs (Chairman: Campbell P. White)
 Post Office and Post Roads (Chairman: Henry W. Connor)
 Private Land Claims (Chairman: Cave Johnson)
 Public Expenditures (Chairman: Thomas Davenport)
 Public Lands (Chairman: Clement C. Clay)
 Revisal and Unfinished Business (Chairman: John Dickson)
 Revolutionary Claims (Chairman: Henry A. P. Muhlenberg)
 Revolutionary Pensions (Chairman: Daniel Wardwell)
 Roads and Canals (Chairman: Charles F. Mercer)
 Rules (Select)
 Standards of Official Conduct
 Territories (Chairman: Lewis Williams)
 Ways and Means (Chairman: James K. Polk)
 Whole

Joint committees

 Enrolled Bills
 The Library

Employees 
 Librarian of Congress: John Silva Meehan

Senate 
 Secretary: Walter Lowrie
 Sergeant at Arms: Mountjoy Bayly, until December 9, 1833
 John Shackford, elected December 9, 1833
 Chaplain: Charles C. Pise (Roman Catholic), until December 10, 1833
 Frederick W. Hatch (Episcopalian), elected December 10, 1833

House of Representatives 
 Clerk: Matthew St. Clair Clarke, until December 2, 1833 
 Walter S. Franklin, elected December 2, 1833
 Sergeant at Arms: John O. Dunn, until December 6, 1833
 Thomas B. Randolph, elected December 6, 1833
 Doorkeeper: Overton Carr
 Postmaster: William J. McCormick
 Reading Clerks: 
 Chaplain: William H. Hammett (Methodist), until December 9, 1833
 Thomas H. Stockton (Methodist), elected December 9, 1833
 Edward D. Smith (Presbyterian), elected December 10, 1834

See also 
 1832 United States elections (elections leading to this Congress)
 1832 United States presidential election
 1832–33 United States Senate elections
 1832–33 United States House of Representatives elections
 1834 United States elections (elections during this Congress, leading to the next Congress)
 1834–35 United States Senate elections
 1834–35 United States House of Representatives elections

Notes

References

External links 
 Statutes at Large, 1789–1875
 Senate Journal, First Forty-three Sessions of Congress
 House Journal, First Forty-three Sessions of Congress
 Biographical Directory of the U.S. Congress
 U.S. House of Representatives: House History
 U.S. Senate: Statistics and Lists